The zones of Rome (Italian: Zone di Roma) are toponymic subdivisions within the area of the Ager Romanus, belonging to the Municipalities of Rome and Fiumicino, Italy.

The total resident population is  inhabitants.

History 
By resolution of the Special Commissioner Nr. 2453 dated 13 September 1961, due to the new urbanization, the entire area of the Ager Romanus falling in the Municipality of Rome was divided into 59 areas, coded with the letter Z followed by Roman numbers.

In 1992, with the constitution of the Municipality of Fiumicino, six whole areas and part of three others were assigned to the new Municipality, then officially suppressed with resolution of the Special Commissioner Nr. 1529 of 8 September 1993.

The following table lists the 59 zones established in 1961.

 Z.I – Val Melaina
 Z.II – Castel Giubileo
 Z.III – Marcigliana
 Z.IV – Casal Boccone
 Z.V – Tor San Giovanni
 Z.VI – Settecamini
 Z.VII – Tor Cervara
 Z.VIII – Tor Sapienza
 Z.IX – Acqua Vergine
 Z.X – Lunghezza
 Z.XI – San Vittorino
 Z.XII – Torre Spaccata
 Z.XIII – Torre Angela
 Z.XIV – Borghesiana
 Z.XV – Torre Maura
 Z.XVI – Torrenova
 Z.XVII – Torre Gaia
 Z.XVIII – Capannelle
 Z.XIX – Casal Morena
 Z.XX – Aeroporto di Ciampino
 Z.XXI – Torricola
 Z.XXII – Cecchignola
 Z.XXIII – Castel di Leva
 Z.XXIV – Fonte Ostiense
 Z.XXV – Vallerano
 Z.XXVI – Castel di Decima
 Z.XXVII – Torrino
 Z.XXVIII – Tor de' Cenci
 Z.XXIX – Castel Porziano
 Z.XXX – Castel Fusano
 Z.XXXI – Mezzocammino
 Z.XXXII – Acilia Nord
 Z.XXXIII – Acilia Sud
 Z.XXXIV – Casal Palocco
 Z.XXXV – Ostia Antica
 Z.XXXVI – Isola Sacra
 Z.XXXVII – Fiumicino
 Z.XXXVIII – Fregene
 Z.XXXIX – Tor di Valle
 Z.XL – Magliana Vecchia
 Z.XLI – Ponte Galeria
 Z.XLII – Maccarese Sud
 Z.XLIII – Maccarese Nord
 Z.XLIV – La Pisana
 Z.XLV – Castel di Guido
 Z.XLVI – Torrimpietra
 Z.XLVII – Palidoro
 Z.XLVIII – Casalotti
 Z.XLIX – Santa Maria di Galeria
 Z.L – Ottavia
 Z.LI – La Storta
 Z.LII – Cesano
 Z.LIII – Tomba di Nerone
 Z.LIV – La Giustiniana
 Z.LV – Isola Farnese
 Z.LVI – Grottarossa
 Z.LVII – Labaro
 Z.LVIII – Prima Porta
 Z.LIX – Polline Martignano

See also 
 Ager Romanus
 Suburbi of Rome
 Administrative subdivision of Rome

Notes

Bibliography

External links 
 

Rome-related lists